Sidney Alderman Blackmer (July 13, 1895 – October 6, 1973) was an American Broadway and film actor active between 1914 and 1971, usually in major supporting roles.

Biography 
Blackmer was born and raised in Salisbury, North Carolina, the son of Clara Deroulhac (née Alderman) and Walter Steele Blackmer. He started in the insurance and financial counseling business but abandoned it. While working as a construction laborer on a new building, he saw a Pearl White serial being filmed and immediately decided to pursue acting as a career. He attended the University of North Carolina at Chapel Hill. Blackmer went to New York, hoping to act on the stage. While in the city, he took jobs and extra work at various film studios at the then motion picture capital, Fort Lee, New Jersey, including a small role in the highly popular serial The Perils of Pauline (1914), his film debut.

He made his Broadway debut in 1917, but his career was interrupted by service in the U.S. Army during World War I. After the war, he returned to the theatre. In 1919, Blackmer played a major role in the strike that led to the formation of the Actors' Equity Association. In 1929 he returned to motion pictures and went on to appear as a major character actor in more than 120 films.

He won the 1950 Tony Award for Best Actor (Drama) for his role in the Broadway play Come Back, Little Sheba, co-starring with Shirley Booth.

In film, Blackmer is remembered for his more than a dozen portrayals of U.S. President Theodore Roosevelt and for his role as the conniving Manhattan warlock Roman Castevet in the guise of one of many overly solicitous elderly neighbors of the pregnant titular character (played by Mia Farrow) in the Academy Award-winning 1968 Roman Polanski film, Rosemary's Baby.

A humanitarian, Blackmer served as the national vice president of the United States Muscular Dystrophy Association. He also helped found the North Carolina School of the Arts. In 1972, he was honored with the North Carolina Award in the Fine Arts category. It is the State of North Carolina's highest civilian award. On his death in 1973, Blackmer was interred in the Chestnut Hill Cemetery in his hometown of Salisbury, North Carolina.

Personal life 
Blackmer was married to actress Lenore Ulric from 1928 to 1939. His second wife was actress Suzanne Kaaren, to whom he was married from 1943 until his death in 1973. He and Kaaren had two sons, one of whom, career federal prosecutor Jonathan Blackmer, has followed in his parents' footsteps in recent years by pursuing a second career in acting. In 1931 Blackmer purchased a home in Salisbury, today known as the Fulton-Mock-Blackmer House, which became the family seat for half a century.

For his contributions to the film industry, Blackmer has a motion pictures star on the Hollywood Walk of Fame at 1625 Vine Street.

Filmography 

 Beating Back (1914)
 A Most Immoral Lady (1929) as Humphrey Sergeant
 The Love Racket (1929) as Fred Masters
 Strictly Modern (1930) as Heath Desmond
 Sweethearts and Wives (1930) as Anthony Peel
 The Bad Man (1930) as Morgan Pell
 Kismet (1930) as Wazir Mansur
 Mothers Cry (1930) as Mr. Gerald Hart
 Little Caesar (1931) as Big Boy
 Woman Hungry (1931) as Geoffrey Brand
 It's a Wise Child (1931) as Steve
 The Lady Who Dared (1931) as Charles Townsend
 From Hell to Heaven (1933) as Cliff Billings
 Cocktail Hour (1933) as William Lawton
 The Wrecker (1933) as Tom Cummings
 Deluge (1933) as Martin Webster
 Goodbye Love (1933) as Chester Hamilton
 This Man Is Mine (1934) as Mort Holmes
 The Count of Monte Cristo (1934) as Mondego
 Down to Their Last Yacht (1934) as Barry Forbes
 Transatlantic Merry-Go-Round (1934) as Lee Lother
 The President Vanishes (1934) as D.L. Voorman
 A Notorious Gentleman (1935) as Clayton Bradford
 The Little Colonel (1935) as Swazey
 Behind the Green Lights (1935) as Raymond Cortell
 Great God Gold (1935) as John Hart
 The Girl Who Came Back (1935) as Bill Rhodes
 Shadows of the Orient (1935) as King Moss
 Smart Girl (1935) as Harry Courtland
 Streamline Express (1935) as Gilbert Landon
 False Pretenses (1935) as Kenneth Alden
 The Fire-Trap (1935) as Cedric McIntyre
 Forced Landing (1935) as Tony Bernardi
 Heart of the West (1936) as John Trumbull
 Woman Trap (1936) as Riley Ferguson
 Florida Special (1936) as Jack Macklyn
 Early to Bed (1936) as Rex Daniels
 Missing Girls (1936) as Dan Collins
 The President's Mystery (1936) as George Sartos
 House of Secrets (1936) as Tom Starr
 Girl Overboard (1937) as Alex LeMaire
 A Doctor's Diary (1937) as Dr. Anson Ludlow
 John Meade's Woman (1937) as Rodney
 Michael O'Halloran (1937) as Jim Mintum
 This Is My Affair (1937) as President Theodore Roosevelt
 The Women Men Marry (1937) as Walter Wiley
 Wife, Doctor and Nurse (1937) as Dr. Therberg
 Heidi (1937) as Sesemann
 The Last Gangster (1937) as Editor
 Charlie Chan at Monte Carlo (1937) as Victor Karnoff
 Thank You, Mr. Moto (1937) as Herr Eric Koerger
 In Old Chicago (1937) as General Phil Sheridan
 Speed to Burn (1938) as Hastings
 Straight, Place and Show (1938) as 'Lucky' Braddock
 Down on the Farm (1938) as Political Boss (uncredited)
 Suez (1938) as Marquis Du Brey
 Sharpshooters (1938) as Baron Orloff
 Orphans of the Street (1938) as Parker
 While New York Sleeps (1938) as Ralph Simmons
 Trade Winds (1938) as Thomas Bruhme II
 Convict's Code (1939) as Gregory Warren
 Fast and Loose (1939) as 'Lucky' Nolan
 Within the Law (1939) as George Demarest
 It's a Wonderful World (1939) as Al Mallon
 Unmarried (1939) as Cash Enright
 Trapped in the Sky (1939) as Mann
 Hotel for Women (1939) as McNeil
 The Monroe Doctrine (1939) as Theodore Roosevelt
 Law of the Pampas (1939) as Ralph Merritt
 Framed (1940) as Tony Bowman
 Teddy, the Rough Rider (1940) as Theodore Roosevelt
 Maryland (1940) as Spencer Danfield
 Dance, Girl, Dance (1940) as Puss in Boots
 I Want a Divorce (1940) as Erskine Brandon
 Third Finger, Left Hand (1940) as Hughie Wheeler
 Cheers for Miss Bishop (1941) as John Stevens
 Murder Among Friends (1941) as Mr. Wheeler
 The Great Swindle (1941) as Dave Lennox
 Rookies on Parade (1941) as Augustus Moody
 Love Crazy (1941) as George Renny
 Angels with Broken Wings (1941) as Guy Barton
 Ellery Queen and the Perfect Crime (1941) as Anthony Rhodes
 The Feminine Touch (1941) as Freddie Bond
 The Officer and the Lady (1941) as Blake Standish
 Down Mexico Way (1941) as Ellery Gibson
 Nazi Agent (1942) as Arnold Milbar
 Obliging Young Lady (1942) as Henry – George's Attorney
 Always in My Heart (1942) as Philip Ames
 The Panther's Claw (1942) as Police Commissioner Thatcher Colt
 Gallant Lady (1942) as Steve Carey
 Sabotage Squad (1942) as Carlyle Harrison
 Quiet Please, Murder (1942) as Martin Cleaver
 Murder in Times Square (1943) as George Nevins
 I Escaped from the Gestapo (1943) as Bergen
 In Old Oklahoma (1943) as Teddy Roosevelt
 Broadway Rhythm (1944) as Press Agent (uncredited)
 Buffalo Bill (1944) as Theodore Roosevelt (uncredited)
 The Lady and the Monster (1944) as Eugene Fulton
 Wilson (1944) as Josephus Daniels
 Duel in the Sun (1946) as The Lover
 My Girl Tisa (1948) as Theodore Roosevelt
 A Song Is Born (1948) as Adams
 People Will Talk (1951) as Arthur Higgins
 Saturday's Hero (1951) as T. C. McCabe
 The San Francisco Story (1952) as Andrew Cain
 Washington Story (1952) as Philip Emery
 The High and the Mighty (1954) as Humphrey Agnew
 Johnny Dark (1954) as James Fielding
 The View from Pompey's Head (1955) as Garvin Wales
 High Society (1956) as Seth Lord
 Beyond a Reasonable Doubt (1956) as Austin Spencer
 Accused of Murder (1956) as Frank Hobart
 Tammy and the Bachelor (1957) as Professor Brent
 How to Murder Your Wife (1965) as Judge Blackstone
 Joy in the Morning (1965) as Dean James Darwent
 A Covenant with Death (1967) as Col. Oates
 Rosemary's Baby (1968) as Roman Castevet
 Revenge Is My Destiny (1971) as Gregory Mann (final film role)

Blackmer also appeared in television roles, such as Don't Come Back Alive episode of the 1955 TV series Alfred Hitchcock Presents and "The Premature Burial" episode of the 1961 TV series Thriller. Blackmer also guest starred twice in the western TV series Bonanza in the episodes "The Dream Riders" (1961) and "The Late Ben Cartwright" (1968).  Among his most notable roles was the character of Presidential candidate William Lyons Selby in the Outer Limits episode "The Hundred Days of the Dragon".

References

External links 

1895 births
1973 deaths
American male film actors
American military personnel of World War I
American male stage actors
Male actors from North Carolina
People from Salisbury, North Carolina
Military personnel from North Carolina
20th-century American male actors
Tony Award winners